Brittny Anderson is a Canadian politician who was elected to the Legislative Assembly of British Columbia in the 2020 British Columbia general election. She represents the electoral district of Nelson-Creston as a member of the British Columbia New Democratic Party.

Anderson was named the premier’s special advisor on youth on April 14, 2021.

Electoral Record

References 

Living people
21st-century Canadian politicians
21st-century Canadian women politicians
British Columbia New Democratic Party MLAs
Women MLAs in British Columbia
Year of birth missing (living people)